Telearuba (Call sign: P4A 13) is a television station that broadcasts on NTSC channel 13 in Aruba with an effective radiated power of 3,456 watts.  The station was founded on 29 September 1963 on channel to offer local programming.  Instrumental in the creation was the role of the Bartell Group, a United States-based set of radio and television stations, as the government of the Netherlands Antilles joined with the Bartell Group to form the  Netherlands Antilles Television & Electronic Company.

The new station received interference from a local Venevisión affiliate in Venezuela, also on channel 12, and was given permission to move to channel 13 later on.  The station also received some technical assistance from TeleCuraçao (PJC-TV), which had also set up a relay transmitter in Aruba.  The station converted to colour broadcasts in 1973.

See also
 TeleCuraçao
 15 ATV
 RTV-7
 Caribbean Broadcasting Union

References

External links
 Official website

Television stations in Aruba
Television channels and stations established in 1963
1963 establishments in Aruba